Didymella pinodella (syn. Phoma pinodella) is a fungal plant pathogen infecting pea and red clover.

References

External links
 Index Fungorum
 USDA ARS Fungal Database

Fungal plant pathogens and diseases
Vegetable diseases
Pleosporales
Fungi described in 1927